The State Agency on Alternative and Renewable Energy Sources, SAARES is a governmental agency 
under the Ministry of Industry and Energy mandated by the Cabinet of Ministers. It serves as the principal regulatory institution in the sphere of alternative and renewable energy in the Republic of Azerbaijan. The State Agency is headed by Akim Badalov.

History
The State Agency on Alternative and Renewable Energy Sources (SAARES) was established following a Presidential Decree on July 16, 2009 as a part of the Ministry of Industry and Energy.

The main purpose is to provide the country with alternative sources of energy. Before the foundation of the Agency, there was “State Program on alternative and renewable energy sources in the Republic of Azerbaijan” approved by Decree No 462 of the President of the Republic of Azerbaijan in October, 2004.

According to the Decree of the President of Azerbaijan Republic Ilham Aliyev in 2012 the agency was liquidated and instead the State Company on Azerbaijan Republic on Alternative and Renewable Energy Sources (ABEMDA) was founded.

State programs 
In 2011 President Ilham Aliyev planned a second government strategy on alternative and renewable energy sources for the years 2012–2020. Targets according to strategy:

 a reduction in greenhouse gas emissions of at least 20% below 1990 levels;
 20% of energy consumption to come from renewable resources; 
 an increase in energy efficiency by 20% by 2020.

The State Program on Use of Alternative and Renewable Energy Sources in Azerbaijan Republic:

 To determine potential of alternative and renewable energy in the electricity power generation; 
 To increase the efficiency of utilization of energy resources through attracting exploitation of renewable energy; 
 To provide additional job places by creating new energy production facilities; 
 To increase energy capacity and achieve energy security in Azerbaijan Republic.

Structure
The agency is headed by its director Akim Badalov and it resides in the Government House in Baku.

Duties
The Agency has the mandate of the principal regulatory institution in the sphere of alternative and renewable energy and is tasked with assessment of sustainable energy potential, shaping relevant policies, including tariff policy, elaboration and enforcement of relevant procedures such as issue of special permissions to the public and private entities to construct power generation facilities.

Function of ABEMDA 

 preparation of state policy, legal acts, regulatory documents 
 implementation of state policy for creation and development of the relevant sphere and infrastructure
 preparation the offers for using of energy sources in relevant areas, projecting of objects, its construction, maintenance and regulation mechanism of activities related to manufacture of equipment necessary for these purposes;
 Monitoring the implementation of the activity in the relevant field.

Current Projects

In spring 2011, SAARES in cooperation with UNDP launched a new project on ‘Promoting Development of Sustainable Energy in Azerbaijan’. This project became possible with the financial support of €500,000 provided by the European Commission and $790,000 contributed by the Government of Norway.

Azerbaijan's energy production is currently largely reliant on the exploitation of the country's hydrocarbon reserves and while the development of renewable energy is one of the government's strategic priorities, the legal and institutional environment are not yet attractive for potential investors. This project aims to assist the Government of Azerbaijan to overcome those barriers by reviewing and amending existing legal and institutional frameworks. The implementation of this project will be a significant step in contributing to achievement of the Millennium Development Goals in Azerbaijan.

A new wind plan called Yeni Yashma was built by Agency in 2015. Its capacity was to generate 50 MW. The plant is expected to be put into service by the end of this year.

Azerbaijan plans to use the windy Caspian Sea in order to expand its alternative energy potential. Wind farms will be built offshore in an area marked by great winds.

Nowadays the total capacity of power generation in the country is 7.2 thousand megawatts. Azerbaijan is able to produce about 24 billion kilowatt-hours and export 2.1 billion kilowatt-hours of electricity every year.

There are tariffs for alternative energy depending on the region in Azerbaijan.

Investments 
Since 2000, approximately 800 million manats have been invested in this sphere.

According to statistics, 9 per cent of the electricity generated in Azerbaijan in 2011 came from renewable sources, nearly entirely from hydro-electric power.

In 2014 the volume of investments made in the development of the alternative energy sphere in Azerbaijan reached 63.6 million manat. The majority of this volume, nearly 34.9 million manat, was allocated to the development of the solar energy sphere, another 28.7 million manat went toward wind power.

The public fund of Azerbaijan invested 127 million manats in the development of alternative and renewable energy sources.

The total capacity of alternative and renewable energy sources in the country is more than 12,000 megawatts. 4,500 MW of them fall on wind energy, biomass – 1,500 MW, geothermal energy – 800 MW, 350 MW - small hydro power plants.

It's planned to increase the share of alternative energy in total production to 20 percent by 2020.  A third of them will come from the wind energy. It requires US$6.7 billion of investment.

Cooperation 
Azerbaijan is supported by Germany in the development of wind power. Also, it's planned to build a solar power plant in Germany in the near future. The capacity of the plant will be approximately 10 megawatts. Works in this domain go on in Turkey too.

State Agency on Alternative and Renewable Energy Sources (SAARES) collaborates with United Nations Development Program.

In 2009, USAID assisted to develop a preferential tariff to speed the development of wind power in Azerbaijan.

Affiliated organizations 

 AzAlternativEnerji LLC 
 AzGunTech LLC 
 Gobustan Polygon 
 Monitoring Center 
 AREA TechnoPark

See also 

 Energy
 Ministry of Energy (Azerbaijan)
 Alternative energy
 Renewable energy
Renewable energy in Azerbaijan

References

Literature 
State Agency on Alternative and Renewable Energy Sources (Azerbaijan)

External links 
 Official website of ABEMDA (SAARES) 
 Green Azerbaijan, additional information

Government agencies of Azerbaijan
Government agencies established in 2009
Renewable energy in Azerbaijan
2009 establishments in Azerbaijan

az:Azərbaycan Respublikası Sənaye və Energetika Nazirliyi